Kaarle Leivonen (17 September 1886 – 23 September 1938) was a Finnish wrestler who competed in the featherweight event at the 1912 Summer Olympics.

References

External links
 

1886 births
1938 deaths
Olympic wrestlers of Finland
Wrestlers at the 1912 Summer Olympics
Finnish male sport wrestlers
People from Jalasjärvi
Sportspeople from South Ostrobothnia